World Series of Fighting 15: Branch vs. Okami was a mixed martial arts event held  in Tampa, Florida, United States. This event aired on NBCSN in the U.S and on TSN2 in Canada.

Background
The main event was a fight for the WSOF Middleweight Championship between champion David Branch and challenger Yushin Okami.

The co-main event between Justin Gaethje and Melvin Guillard was originally scheduled to be for the WSOF Lightweight Championship.  However, Guillard missed the 155 pound weight allowance for the title fight, weighing 158.8 pounds.  As a result, the bout was changed to a non-title catchweight bout with Guillard agreeing to give fifty percent of his purse to Gaethje. In the main event on the preliminary card Maurice Salmon was able to score a TKO victory via doctor stoppage over Javier Torres. Early in the bout Torres complained to the referee about eye pokes, but the bout continued and the two kept the action going. Salmon was able to land a devastating left and a flurry of ground and pound until the bell. After an eye injury the bout stopped in the first round. Salmon told reporters he was displeased with Torres head butting during the weigh-ins.

This event aired against UFC 180 and Bellator 131 making it the first time three major martial arts promotion's air events on the same night.

Results

See also 
 List of WSOF champions
 List of WSOF events

References

Events in Tampa, Florida
World Series of Fighting events
2014 in mixed martial arts